Johan Libéreau  (born 27 September 1984) is a French actor. He was an apprentice pastry chef and waiter, before being spotted by an agent.

Filmography 
 2003: Tais-toi! as Adolescent 2
 2004: Julie Lescaut episode "Sans pardon" as Michel
 2005: Cold showers as Mickael
 2006: In the forefront
 2007: The Witnesses as Manu
 2008: Un coeur simple
 2008: Stella
 2009: Je te mangerais
 2009: Vertigo
 2011: Q
 2011: 18 Years Old and Rising
 2011: Twiggy
 2012: Sister
 2013: Grand Central
 2013: 11.6
 2015: Cosmos
 2017: The Faithful Son

External links

 
 Unifrance

1984 births
Living people
French male film actors
Male actors from Paris
21st-century French male actors
French male television actors
Most Promising Actor Lumières Award winners